This is a list of transfers in Serbian football for the 2016–17 summer transfer window.
 Moves featuring Serbian SuperLiga and Serbian First League sides are listed.
 The order by which the clubs are listed is equal to the classifications at the end of the 2015–16 Serbian SuperLiga and 2015–16 Serbian First League.

Serbian SuperLiga

Red Star Belgrade

In: 

 

Out:

Partizan

In:

Out:

Čukarički

In: 

Out:

Vojvodina

In: 

Out:

Radnički Niš

In: 

Out:

Borac Čačak

In: 

Out:

Voždovac

In: 

Out:

Radnik Surdulica

In: 

Out:

Mladost Lučani

In: 

 

Out:

Spartak Subotica

In: 

Out:

Metalac G. M.

In: 

Out:

Rad

In: 

Out:

Javor Ivanjica

In: 

Out:

Novi Pazar

In: 

Out:

Napredak Kruševac

In: 

Out:

Bačka BP

In: 

Out:

Serbian First League

OFK Beograd

In: 

Out:

Jagodina

In: 

Out:

ČSK Čelarevo

In: 

Out:

Inđija

In: 

Out:

Bežanija

In: 

Out:

Sinđelić Beograd

In: 

Out:

Kolubara

In: 

Out:

Proleter Novi Sad

In: 

Out:

BSK Borča

In: 

Out:

Zemun

In: 

Out:

Dinamo Vranje

In: 

Out:

OFK Odžaci

In: 

Out:

Mačva Šabac

In: 

Out:

Budućnost Dobanovci

In: 

Out:

Radnički Pirot

In: 

Out:

Sloboda Užice

In: 

Out:

See also
Serbian SuperLiga
2016–17 Serbian SuperLiga
Serbian First League
2016–17 Serbian First League

References

Serbian SuperLiga
2016
transfers